The Ladies in the Green Hats (French: Ces dames aux chapeaux verts) is a 1937 French comedy drama film directed by Maurice Cloche and starring Marguerite Moreno, Alice Tissot and Micheline Cheirel.

Cast
 Marguerite Moreno as Telcide  
 Alice Tissot as Marie  
 Micheline Cheirel as Arlette  
 Mady Berry as Ernestine  
 Pierre Larquey as Ulysse Hyacinthe  
 Gilbert Landry as Jacques de Fleurville  
 Pierre Magnier as M. de Fleurville  
 André Numès Fils as Emile Dutoit  
 Georges Mauloy as Le grand Doyen 
 Nicolas Amato 
 Marcelle Barry as Jeanne  
 Jacques Beauvais as Le livreur  
 Félix Claude 
 Nicole Ferrier as Jessy  
 Gabrielle Fontan as Rosalie 
 Anthony Gildès as Le commissaire  
 Vyola Vareyne as Noémi

References

Bibliography 
 Goble, Alan. The Complete Index to Literary Sources in Film. Walter de Gruyter, 1999.

External links 
 

1937 films
French comedy-drama films
1937 comedy-drama films
1930s French-language films
Films directed by Maurice Cloche
Films based on French novels
Remakes of French films
Sound film remakes of silent films
French black-and-white films
1930s French films